The following is a representative list of games classified in the survival genre.

List

References 

Survival games
Survival games